Windsor Locks station is an Amtrak and CT Rail train station in Windsor Locks, Connecticut, on the New Haven–Springfield Line. It is served by four Amtrak services - the  shuttles, and  - as well as CT Rail Hartford Line commuter rail trains.

The current station has only a small platform and shelter. A new station with high-level platforms is planned to be built in downtown Windsor Locks, where the station was located until 1981. The former station building at that site is listed on the National Register of Historic Places as Windsor Locks Passenger Station.

History

The Hartford and New Haven Railroad opened through Windsor Locks in 1839. The New York, New Haven, and Hartford Railroad, its successor, built a new station in the town center in 1875. The station building was closed by Penn Central in 1971; Penn Central and later Amtrak passengers continued to use the platform, but Penn Central used the interior as a signal workshop. Penn Central later attempted to demolish the station, but a local group succeeded in having it listed on the National Register of Historic Places in 1975. Amtrak bought the Springfield Line infrastructure, including the "remarkably intact" station, in 1976. Service moved to the current location – a new park and ride stop just south of Interstate 91 – in 1981.

The 2004 Recommended Action of the New Haven Hartford Springfield Commuter Rail Implementation Study included the construction of a new Windsor Locks station on the existing south-of-downtown site. A single high-level platform was to be constructed, with a pedestrian bridge leading to an added parking area on the west side of South Main Street. A second platform serving a restored second track would have been added later.

However, local preference was to move the station stop back to the original downtown site. Spurred by a 2000 arson that damaged the structure, the Windsor Locks Preservation Association (WLPA) was formed in 2004 to support repair and reuse of the building. By 2007, the WLPA and the town had secured $274,000 of the estimated $700,000 to purchase and repair the station, and serious consideration was being given to moving the Amtrak stop there as well. However, after years of unsuccessful negotiations about the sale and future use, the WLPA disbanded in 2011. The town took over negotiations and purchased the station from Amtrak in December 2014. In 2015, the town began planning renovations of the station building for future use as a "shared workspace".

Hartford Line plans from 2012 included two possible station sites: one at the existing station with an enlargement of the current parking lot, and one at the former location with a new parking lot. Either location would have -long high level platforms serving the current track plus a restored second track, with a pedestrian bridge connecting the two platforms. Funding for the new station and second track were not included in initial Hartford Line funding. Service, which started on June 16, 2018, uses the existing station. In February 2017, the state announced an additional $50 million in funds, including money to complete design of the relocated Windsor Locks station. Design work will be completed by 2020.

, the state plans for the station replacement to be a $65 million project. A -long high-level platform, brick shelter, and parking lot will be built at the downtown site, just north of the former station building. A -long passing siding will be built, and the connection to the Suffield Branch reconfigured. A new maintenance-of-way yard will be built at the existing station site. The project also includes the reconstruction of Route 159 between Bridge Street and the station, including a multi-use path to connect with the Windsor Locks Canal State Park Trail at Bridge Street. Construction is anticipated to start in late 2020 and be completed in late 2023.

In February 2020, the state received a $17.4 million federal grant for the project. Demolition of a nearby structure began in March 2020. The state approved $45 million in bonds for the project in April 2020. The town plans for transit-oriented development adjacent to the station, including a public market and apartment buildings. The town was awarded $130,000 in December 2020 for restoration of the station building. In March 2021, the town reached an agreement with a developer to restore the building for use as a welcome center, cafe, and brewery.

Bidding for the project began in November 2021. Construction began in September 2022 and is expected to be complete in mid-2025, with a total project cost of $87 million.

See also
National Register of Historic Places listings in Hartford County, Connecticut

References

External links 

Windsor Locks – Hartford Line
Windsor Locks Amtrak Station (USA Rail Guide -- Train Web)

Amtrak stations in Connecticut
Stations on the New Haven–Springfield Line
Stations along New York, New Haven and Hartford Railroad lines
Railway stations in Hartford County, Connecticut
Windsor Locks, Connecticut
Railway stations in the United States opened in 1875
National Register of Historic Places in Hartford County, Connecticut
1875 establishments in Connecticut
Railway stations on the National Register of Historic Places in Connecticut